Stade Municipal is a multi-use stadium in Odienne, Côte d'Ivoire.  It is currently used mostly for football matches. It serves as a home ground of Denguelé Sports d'Odienné. The stadium holds 3,000 people.

Football venues in Ivory Coast
Sport in Denguélé District
Buildings and structures in Denguélé District
Odienné